Bianca Andreescu defeated Angelique Kerber in the final, 6–4, 3–6, 6–4 to win the women's singles tennis title at the 2019 Indian Wells Open. It was her maiden WTA Tour title, and Andreescu became the first wildcard champion in the tournament's history, as well as the youngest champion since Serena Williams in 1999. This marked the second consecutive year where a player won the tournament as her maiden WTA Tour singles title.

Naomi Osaka was the defending champion, but lost to Belinda Bencic in the fourth round. Osaka retained the WTA no. 1 singles ranking despite failing to defend her title. Petra Kvitová, Simona Halep, Sloane Stephens and Karolína Plíšková were also in contention for the top ranking.

Seeds
All seeds received a bye into the second round.

Draw

Finals

Top half

Section 1

Section 2

Section 3

Section 4

Bottom half

Section 5

Section 6

Section 7

Section 8

Qualifying

Seeds

Qualifiers

Draw

First qualifier

Second qualifier

Third qualifier

Fourth qualifier

Fifth qualifier

Sixth qualifier

Seventh qualifier

Eighth qualifier

Ninth qualifier

Tenth qualifier

Eleventh qualifier

Twelfth qualifier

References

External links
 Main draw
 Qualifying draw

Women's Singles